Neorossia caroli, the Carol bobtail squid,  is a species of bobtail squid  belonging to the family Sepiolidae.

Etymology
The species name caroli derives from Carolus, Latinized name of Carlos. It honors H. M. the King don Carlos of Portugal.

Subspecies
Subspecies include:
N. c. jeannae (southwest Atlantic)
N. c. caroli (northeast, east, and southeast Atlantic)

Distribution and habitat
This species is widespread in the Atlantic Ocean from Iceland and the United Kingdom southwards along the Atlantic coast of Europe and Africa as far south as Namibia, the Patagonian slope, and Falkland Islands. It is also present in the Mediterranean and Black Seas. This bottom-living species occurs in areas of muddy substrate at depths of 40 to 1744 m.

Description
N. caroli can reach a mantle length of 51 mm in males, while in females, the mantle length can attain 83 mm. Its body is soft and fleshy, and the mantle is broad and oval. The dorsal border of the mantle is not fused to the head. Arms have two rows of suckers. The ink sac is not functional.

Biology
These squids usually bury in muddy substrate during the day, emerging only at night to feed. During copulation, the male inserts the arm (hectocotylus) specialized to store and transfer spermatophores into the female's mantle cavity. Spawning occurs throughout the year. The eggs are violet and rather large. They are attached to hard substrates. Males and females usually die after spawning and brooding.

References

Further reading
Belloc, G. - Catalogue des types de Cephalopodes du Musee Oceanographique de Monaco  - 
Boletzky, S. V. - Neorossia n.g. pro Rossia (Allorossia) caroli Joubin, 1902, with remarks on the generic status of Semirossia Steenstrup, 1887 (Mollusca: Cephalopoda) - 
Joubin, L. - Observations sur divers Cephalopodes. Sixieme note: Sur une nouvelle espece du genre Rossia  - Bulletin de la Société Zoologique de France, 27
Sweeney, M. J. and C. F. E. Roper / N. A. Voss, M. Vecchione, R. B. Toll and M. J. Sweeney - Classification, type localities and type repositories of recent Cephalopoda  - Systematics and Biogeography of Cephalopods. Smithsonian Contributions to Zoology, 586 (I-II)

External links
 Neorossia at Tolweb

Bobtail squid
Molluscs described in 1992
Marine molluscs of Europe
Cephalopods of Europe